Margareta Bengtson (born 1966) (formerly Margareta Jalkéus, having married and divorced Real Group bandmate Anders Jalkeus) is the former soprano of The Real Group, a professional a cappella vocal jazz quintet from Sweden. She sang with the group for over twenty years and has recently announced her departure from the world-renowned ensemble.

History and Education

Bengtson comes from a very musical family. Her mother taught voice for many years and her father, now retired, was once the principal flautist in the Royal Swedish Opera's orchestra.

At age ten, she began studies at Adolf Fredrik's Music School in Stockholm, where she attended for ten years. She began playing the harp at 12.

In 1984, she entered the solo-harp class at the Royal College of Music in Stockholm, where she studied for 5 years. The same year she became a member of the vocal ensemble The Real Group. In 1987 the group was offered a course of advanced study at the college and this continued until 1989, when they gave three diploma concerts in Stockholm. The Real Group has been a professional ensemble since then.

Release of first Solo Album
On October 25, 2006, Bengtson released her first solo jazz album entitled "I'm Old Fashioned" with EMI. For her first solo project, Bengtson has recorded ten American jazz standards. All arrangements of which are attributed to members of the band, who all are from Sweden as well. Pål Svenre is the producer.

References

Swedish jazz singers
Royal College of Music, Stockholm alumni
Living people
1966 births